Tantaliana tantalus is a moth in the family Eupterotidae. It was described by Gottlieb August Wilhelm Herrich-Schäffer in 1854. It is found in South Africa and the Gambia.

References

Moths described in 1854
Janinae